The Nizhny Novgorod International Model United Nations (abbreviated NNovIMUN), is a model that has been held by the Faculty of International Relations at N. I. Lobachevsky State University of Nizhny Novgorod (abbreviated NNSU) since 2007. More than 130 students per year take part in it being citizens either of foreign countries or different regions of Russia. Since 2010, the Nizhny Novgorod School Model United Nations (abbreviated NNovSMUN) has been realized under the frameworks of the NNovIMUN.

Description 
The Nizhny Novgorod International Model United Nations is a political role play which accurately reproduces the work of the UN bodies. The Model covers problems similar to issues which are under consideration of the UN. This provides acknowledgement of how decisions are taken at the highest international level.
Traditionally, the NNovIMUN takes place in the middle of March and lasts either for 4 or 5 days. There are several languages used during sessions. Furthermore, there are cultural events prepared for each session day except for the only one which is completely devoted to the work of committees.
In 2010, the Nizhny Novgorod Model United Nations was assigned the status of an international one. Several UN bodies had different official languages for the first time:
1.	The United Nations Human Rights Council (Russian)
2.	The United Nations Security Council (English)
3.	The International Court of Justice (French)
NNovIMUN’s participants study the most burning urgent agendum of the UN. Final projects of resolutions are sent to the UN News Centre in Moscow.

NNovIMUN 2013 
The NNovIMUN 2013 was held from the 10th till the 14th of March. This year, the Model had two new bodies: the International Atomic Energy Agency (abbreviated IAEA) (English), the League of Arab States (Arabic). The registration started in November.

Secretariat 
NNovIMUN Secretariat is annually formed in September. Everyone who has had an experience of being a delegate in the Model United Nations is allowed to be the Secretariat member. It is important that not only students of the Faculty of International Relations at NNSU participate in the Model. Representatives of other universities and countries take part in it either.

Delegates 
By 2012, the NNovIMUN had connected participants from many Russian cities and foreign countries, which made these students face the challenge of arranging the international dialogue and reaching compromises in issues of international importance.
Representatives of
 Russian cities (Moscow, Kazan, Yaroslavl, Voronezh, Izhevsk, Chita);
 distant countries and the Russian near-abroad (Belarus, Latvia, Germany, Austria, Hungary, the USA, the PRC, Ivory Coast and Ghana)
were discussing agendum in committees, taking part in cultural events and competing for the title of the best delegate during those 4 days.

The best delegate
Traditionally, two best delegates of committees are elected at the end of the NNovIMUN session via secret ballot. One winner is assigned by a presidium of a committee. The other one is chosen straight by other delegates. Results of an election are based on the following criteria:
 an ability to champion economical, geopolitical etc. interests of a country;
 delegate’s activity in formal and informal debates;
 session attendance.
If a delegate does not take part in committee’s work for 2 days or more, his/her certificate of a participant is deprived.

Organizers 
The NNovIMUN is held by the Faculty of International Relations at NNSU. The Model’s main organizers are students of the faculty. Ideological inspirers are Svetlana Anatolyevna Kolobova and Oleg Alekseyevich Kolobov, who is a creator and a dean (2002-2012) of the Faculty of International Relations.
Broadening and improving, the NNovIMUN has managed to enlist the support of the UN News Centre in Russia, Moscow State Institute of International Relations, the office of Ministry of Foreign Affairs of the Russian Federation in Nizhny Novgorod, the UN Assistance Fund in Nizhny Novgorod and the Nizhny Novgorod Administration.

Cultural events 
Bright cultural events are prepared by the NNovIMUN every year, which gives participants an opportunity to try team building, take part in the multicultural festival “Global Village” and visit other significant events in Nizhny Novgorod. The “Global Village” has been held within the frameworks of the NNovIMUN since 2012. It has managed to become one of the most memorable and expected events.

The idea consists in original presentation of a region or a country by delegates.
In 2012, the participants gave a superb performance of dancing teams, poem readers, singers and some of them even cooked dishes of their national cuisine. The fact that each participant takes part in the “Global Village” makes this show really unforgettable.
The informal NNovIMUN session closing takes place in one of the Nizhny Novgorod clubs.
In addition, in 2013, excursions to some towns of the Nizhny Novgorod region are planned to be realized as well. All details will be stated later.

Nizhny Novgorod School Model UN

See also 
 United Nations — an international organization whose stated aims are facilitating cooperation in international law, international security, economic development, social progress, human rights, and achievement of world peace.
 Model United Nations — an article about the Model movement in Russia and other countries

References 
 «Первая Нижегородская модель ООН может возникнуть на базе ННГУ», Regional News Agency of the Nizhny Novgorod Administration – Vremya,2008. 
 «Нижегородские студенты 13 февраля сыграют в "Модель ООН"», V Gorode N, 2009.
 «Нижегородские студенты создадут модель ООН», Youth News Net Agency, 2010.
 «Нижегородские школьники и студенты стали делегатами мира», Argumenty i Fakty (Nizhny Novgorod), №013 31-03-2010, p. 28, 2010.
 «Открытие пятого молодежного образовательного форума "Нижегородская Международная модель ООН" », Independent News Agency "Nizhny Novgorod", 2012.
 «Школьная Модель ООН», Krasny Sormovich.

External links 
 Официальный сайт Нижегородской Международной Модели ООН
 Официальный сайт Факультета Международных Отношений Нижегородского Государственного Университета имени Н.И.Лобачевского

Model United Nations
Youth organizations based in Russia